Shāh Abdul Azīz Hotak (died 1717) was the second ruler of the Ghilji Hotak dynasty of Kandahar, in what is now the modern state of Afghanistan. He was crowned in 1715 after the death of his brother, Mirwais Hotak. He was the father of Ashraf Hotak, the fourth ruler of the Hotak dynasty. Abdul Aziz was killed in 1717 by his nephew Mahmud Hotak.

Early life
Abdul Aziz was born in a wealthy and politically connected family in the Kandahar area. His family had been involved in social and community services for many years. He was the son of Salim Khan and Nazo Tokhi (also known as "Nazo Anaa"), grandson of Karum Khan and great grandson of Ismail Khan, a descendant of Malikyar, the original head of the Hottaki or Hotaks. The Hottaki is an important branch of Ghilji, one of the main tribes among the Pashtun people. 

Hajji Amanullah Hottak reports in his book that the Ghilji tribe were the original residents of Ghor or Gherj. This tribe migrated later to obtain lands in southeastern Afghanistan and then grew in number in this region.

In 1707, Kandahar was in a state of chaos due to it being fought over for control by the Shi'a Persian Safavids and the Sunni Moghuls of India. Mirwais Khan, a Sunni tribal chief whose influence with his fellow-countrymen made him an object of suspicion, was held as a political prisoner by the Safavid governor of the region, Gurgin Khan, and sent to the Safavids' court at Isfahan. He was later released and even allowed to meet regularly with the Shah, Sultan Husayn. Having ingratiated himself with the Safavid court, Mirwais sought and obtained permission to perform the pilgrimage to Mecca in the Ottoman empire. He had studied carefully all the military weaknesses of the Safavids while he spent time in their court.

In 1709 Mirwais and Abdul Aziz began organising their countrymen in preparation for a major uprising. When a significant number of the  Safavid garrison were on an expedition outside the city, followers of Mirwais and Abdul Aziz fell on the remainder and killed the greater number of them, including Gurgin Khan.

The Pashtun tribes rankled under the ruling Safavids because of their continued attempts to forcefully convert them from Sunni to Shia Islam. After Gurgin Khan and his escort were killed in April 1709, the Hotak tribe took control of the city and the province. The Pashtun rebels then defeated a large Qizilbash and Persian army, sent to gain control over the area.

Death
Abdul Aziz wanted to make a peace treaty with the Persians but his country men were opposed to this idea so they forced Mahmud Hotak to murder him in 1717. Mahmud Hotak then succeeded Abdul Aziz as Emir.

Abdul Aziz was buried at a mausoleum next to his brother in the Kokaran section of Kandahar City in Afghanistan.

See also
Hotak dynasty
History of Afghanistan

References

External links
Encyclopædia Britannica Online – Last Afghan empire

17th-century births
1717 deaths
18th-century Afghan monarchs
18th-century murdered monarchs
Pashtun people
People from Kandahar
Emirs of Afghanistan
Hotak dynasty
1717 murders in Asia